Sir Robert Onley was the member of Parliament for Coventry in 1485. He was also mayor twice in the 1480s. He was a woolman.

References 

Members of the Parliament of England for Coventry
English MPs 1485
Year of birth missing
Year of death missing
Mayors of Coventry
English knights